The 2017 European Beach Handball Championship was held in Zagreb, Croatia from 20 to 25 June 2017.

Format
Men's competition contains fourteen teams, split into two groups of seven teams while women's competition contains fifteen teams, split in three groups of five teams. After playing a round-robin, the four top ranked team advanced to the Main Round. Every team kept the points from preliminary round matches against teams who also advanced. In the main round every team had 2 games against the opponents they did not face in the preliminary round. All teams advanced to the Quarter-finals. The two bottom ranked team from each preliminary round group were packed into one group. The points won against the teams who were also in this group were valid.

Matches were played in sets, the team that wins two sets is the winner of a match. When teams are equal in points the head-to-head result was decisive.

Men

Preliminary round

Group A

Group B

Main round

Group I

Group II

Placement round 9−14

Knockout stage

Championship bracket

5–8th place bracket

Final standings

Women

Preliminary round

Group A

Group B

Group C

Main round

Group I

Group II

Placement round 13−15

Placement round 9−12

Knockout stage

Championship bracket

5–8th place bracket

Final standings

References

European Beach Handball Championship
Beach Handball Championship
Beach Handball Championship
2017 in Croatian sport
International handball competitions hosted by Croatia
Sports competitions in Zagreb
June 2017 sports events in Europe